Future Primitive is the fifth studio album by Australian alternative rock band The Vines. It was released on 3 June 2011.

Background 

The majority of the album was recorded at Studios 301 in Sydney, Australia during February and March 2010 with producer Christopher Colonna of The Bumblebeez. Additional recording and production touch-ups occurred throughout the following year (2010 – early 2011) whilst the band shopped the album to potential record labels, as they were without a label at the time having financed the recording sessions themselves. The band signed to Sony Music Australia for the release.

Lead track "Gimme Love" is the opening track of The Inbetweeners Movie.

"Black Dragon" and "Goodbye" are used in the opening titles of Borderlands: The Pre-Sequel.

Track listing

Charts

Tour dates

Personnel 

 The Vines

 Craig Nicholls – vocals, guitars
 Ryan Griffiths – guitars, backing vocals
 Hamish Rosser – drums, percussion
 Brad Heald – bass guitar, backing vocals

 Additional personnel

 Christopher Colonna – recording, production, mixing
 Mike Morgan – engineer
 Julien Delfaud – mixing at Motorbass Studio, Paris, France
 Jono Ma – additional programming
 Leif Podhajsky – album cover artwork
 Cybele Malinowski – photography

References 

2011 albums
Sony Music Australia albums
The Vines (band) albums